Numb Chucks is a Canadian animated television series that was created by Phil LaFrance and Jamie LeClaire and premiered on YTV in Canada on January 7, 2014. The series was focused on Dilweed and Fungus, two woodchucks with big hearts, who are obsessed with using their bungling kung-fu skills to protect the lives of the citizens in their town of Ding-a-Ling Springs. The series was cancelled, and its final episode aired on December 1, 2016, after a total of 52 episodes were produced.

Plot
Before one night changed their lives, woodchuck brothers Dilweed and Fungus never saw themselves as heroes. But during a late-night-TV infomercial, they ordered a Woodchuck Morris kung-fu video. Now, they have made it their mission to become just as awesome as their kung-fu mentor. Misguided but with good intentions, the brothers become obsessed with using their newfound skills to protect the citizens in their town of Ding-a-Ling Springs. Dilweed and Fungus take on a never-ending quest to fight off danger with Morris' guidance.

Episodes

Characters

 Dilweed Chuck (voiced by Terry McGurrin)
 Fungus Chuck (voiced by Lou Attia (Season 1) and Cory Doran (season 2))
 Quills (voiced by Bryn McAuley)
 Buford G. Butternut (voiced by Andrew Jackson)
 Grandma Butternut (voiced by Julie Lemieux)
 Sir Rupert Van Der Hooves (voiced by Robert Tinkler)
 Woodchuck Morris (voiced by Joris Jarsky)

Other voices
 David Berni as Reckless Randall, Additional Voices
 Sean Cullen
 Linda Kash
 Emilie-Claire Barlow
 Howard Jerome 
 Laurie Elliott
 Dwayne Hill
 Ron Pardo
 Adrian Truss

Production
The series is produced by Jam Filled Entertainment and 9 Story Media Group, in association with YTV, and was produced with the participation of The Canadian Film or Video Production Tax Credit, The Canada Media Fund, Ontario Film and Television Tax Credit, Ontario Computer Animation and Special Effects Tax Credit and with the financial participation of The Shaw Rocket Fund.

Telecast and home media
Numb Chucks  premiered on YTV in Canada on January 7, 2014 until its final episode aired on December 1, 2016. The series is currently in repeats on YTV and formerly aired repeats on Teletoon and Nickelodeon.

On March 10, 2014, Cartoon Network announced the series as part of its 2014–15 season to air on the network in the USA. However, it was later moved to Boomerang and it ran from January 10 to July 12, 2015.

Numb Chucks has also been sold to Cartoon Network (Latin America), ABC (Australia), Disney Channels (Central & Eastern Europe, Middle East & Africa, Asia, Israel and Benelux), TG4 (Ireland), Cartoon Network (Italy), Canal+ Family (France) and Super RTL (Germany). The series also airs on TV2 in New Zealand. The series premiered in the United Kingdom on November 1, 2015 on Pop and Pop Max, several months after Boomerang US dumped it.

In the Hebrew, the series premiered on Disney Channel on May 7, 2014 to 2016. And then there were 26 episodes in Hebrew.

In the Italy, the series premiered on Boing on October 20, 2014.

There is no DVD release.

Currently, the series is now streaming on Tubi.

References

External links
 

 

2014 Canadian television series debuts
2016 Canadian television series endings
2010s Canadian animated television series
Canadian children's animated comedy television series
Canadian children's animated fantasy television series
English-language television shows
Television series by Corus Entertainment
Television series by 9 Story Media Group
Animated television series about mammals
Animated television series about brothers
YTV (Canadian TV channel) original programming
Boomerang (TV network) original programming
Television series by Jam Filled Entertainment